Germany competed as host nation at the 2018 European Athletics Championships in Berlin, Germany, from 6-12 August 2018. A delegation of 128 athletes were sent to represent the country. 

The following athletes were selected to compete by the German Athletics Federation.

 Men 
 Track and road

Field events

Combined events – Decathlon

Women
 Track and road

Field events

Combined events – Heptathlon

See also
Germany at the 2018 European Championships

References

Nations at the 2018 European Athletics Championships
Germany at the European Athletics Championships
European Athletics Championships